Mormon No More is an American documentary television series that premiered on Hulu on June 24, 2022. The show follows Sally "Sal" Osborne and Lena Schwen as they discover their Lesbian sexuality and leave the Mormon faith. The series also includes interviews and stories from other Mormon and ex-Mormon members of the LGBTQ+ community. Matt Easton, Brad Talbot, Brock Aiken, and Polly Choque-Mendoza all share their stories of struggle to reconcile their faith with their sexuality.

Episodes

See also 

 List of Hulu original programming
 Under the Banner of Heaven
 Keep Sweet: Pray and Obey

References 

2022 American television series debuts
2020s American documentary television series
Television series about religion
2020s American LGBT-related television series
Hulu original programming